Derderian is an Armenian-language surname Դերդերյան. Notable people with the surname include:

Hovnan Derderian (born 1957), Lebanese-Armenian Apostolic archbishop
Mariana Derderian (born 1980), Chilean actress
Yeghishe Derderian of Jerusalem (1911–1990), Armenian bishop and scholar

Armenian-language surnames